The Fuguijiao or Cape Fugui Lighthouse is a lighthouse on Cape Fugui near Laomei Village   in Shimen District, New Taipei City, Taiwan.

Name
The lighthouse is named after nearby Cape Fugui, the northernmost point of Taiwan. Its Japanese name was  Its Chinese name (derived from a Hokkien transcription of the Dutch word , meaning "hook" or "cape") is also romanized  for the Chinese Postal Map,  using simplified Wade-Giles, and Fugueijiao from Tongyong Pinyin. It was also sometimes known in English as the

History
A structure was first erected on the rocks at Cape Fugui in 1896 or 1897 by the occupying Japanese. It was a terminus for undersea cables from the Japanese islands and its construction materials all came from there. It was ruined during World War II but its remains were used by China's Nationalist government for the erection of a  octagonal iron lighthouse in 1949. The foghorn was particularly needful, owing to poor visibility in the area during the fall and winter months.

The lighthouse's current  concrete black-and-white octagonal tower was raised in 1962. The height was greatly reduced to improve the reception of the nearby air force radar station.

Taiwan's Customs traditionally welcomed visitors to the lighthouse once a year on Tax Day as an open house gesture. After the enthusiastic public response to opening Eluanbi Lighthouse to more general tourism, Taiwan's Maritime and Port Bureau decided to open Fuguijiao to regular visitors in 2015. The first tourists were allowed onto the grounds on September 5, making it the 11th Taiwanese lighthouse opened to the general public. It remains inaccessible on weekdays because of the radar station. The tower itself remains closed to the public.

Transportation

See also

 List of Taiwanese superlatives
 List of tourist attractions in Taiwan
 List of lighthouses in Taiwan

References

Citations

Bibliography
 .
 .

1896 establishments in Taiwan
1949 establishments in Taiwan
Lighthouses completed in 1949
Lighthouses in New Taipei